Robert Orgill Leman (1799–1869) was an English painter of landscapes and a member of the Norwich School of painters.

Life

Robert Orgill Leman was born on 12 April 1799 as Robert Orgill, the son of Naunton Thomas Orgill and his wife 	Henrietta Jane Anderson, and was baptised on the same day. His father, the Reverend Naunton Thomas Orgill, succeeded to the estates of the Leman family and was obliged to add the family name to Leman as a result. Studying under John Sell Cotman, he became a talented amateur landscape painter and exhibited his works in Norwich with the Norwich Society of Artists. Leman differed from many of his artistic friends in the Society by not having to sell his works for a living: he painted and etched drawings for his own interest. He died in 1869 and was buried at Brampton, the village in Suffolk where he was born.

References

External links
Works by Robert Leman at the British Museum
Works by Robert Leman at the Norfolk Museums Collections
Robert Orgill Leman - Suffolk Artists website
Works by Robert Leman at Art UK
Robert Leman on Artnet

Bibliography 

1799 births
1869 deaths
British landscape artists
Artists from Suffolk
People from Waveney District